Oxyrrhexis is a genus of ichneumon wasps in the family Ichneumonidae. There are at least four described species in Oxyrrhexis.

Species
These four species belong to the genus Oxyrrhexis:
 Oxyrrhexis carbonator (Gravenhorst, 1807)
 Oxyrrhexis chinensis He, 1996
 Oxyrrhexis eurus Kasparyan, 1977
 Oxyrrhexis zephyrus Fritzén & Fjellberg, 2014

References

Further reading

External links

 

Pimplinae